African Adventure is a 1963 children's book by the Canadian-born American author Willard Price featuring his "Adventure" series characters, Hal and Roger Hunt.

On Safari in Uganda, Hal and Roger manage to capture a varied collection of African animals including a pigeon, hyena, cape buffalo, and leopard. But their efforts are threatened by the antics of fraudulent White Hunter "Colonel" Benjamin Bigg, and by a member of the Leopard Society who is out to kill them.

Legacy
Richard Phillips cites African Adventure as an example of western authors acknowledging decolonisation, albeit through a traditionally colonial lens. "Though Price acknowledges African anti-colonial resistance," Phillips writes, "he collapses it back into a form of primitivism and savagery." In 2015, Tim Dee, writing for The Guardian, included African Adventure on his list of the "10 best nature books."

References

1963 American novels
Novels by Willard Price
Novels set in Uganda
American children's novels
American adventure novels
Jonathan Cape books
1963 children's books
John Day Company books